"For You" is a song written and recorded by Bruce Springsteen in 1972 for his debut album Greetings from Asbury Park, N.J., released in 1973. It was later included on the compilation album The Essential Bruce Springsteen. The song has been covered by Manfred Mann's Earth Band, The Format, and Greg Kihn.

Lyrics and music 
"For You" was recorded at 914 Sound Studios in Blauvelt, New York on June 27, 1972, the same day as the rest of the album except "Blinded by the Light" and "Spirit in the Night". Musicians participating in these sessions included future E Street Band members David Sancious, Garry Tallent and Vini Lopez. It is a climactic, percussion-driven song. Unlike many other songs on Springsteen's debut album, it takes the time to pace and build.
The lyrics are about a woman who has attempted suicide. She does not need the singer's "urgency" even though her life is "one long emergency" as Springsteen sings in the chorus (along with "and your cloud line urges me, and my electric surges free"). The singer is committed to doing anything to save her, and admires her ability to hang on. Once again, the lyrics are evocative of images and not details, and little can be said in description.

In many live concerts, including the critically acclaimed Hammersmith Odeon London '75, Bruce transformed the song into a tender piano ballad without accompaniment.

Cover versions

Greg Kihn version

The song was also covered by Greg Kihn on his 1977 album Greg Kihn Again. Kihn's cover received favorable comments from Springsteen. It was also included on the compilation album Best of Kihn.

Manfred Mann's Earth Band version

Like "Blinded By The Light"  (on The Roaring Silence) and "Spirits in the Night" (on Nightingales & Bombers), this song was covered by Manfred Mann's Earth Band for their album Chance. As with Manfred Mann Earth Band's previous Springsteen covers, they used a more forceful, rockier sound in "For You" than Springsteen did. The Earth Band version built from a more temperate beginning to an explosion of sound in the bridge, and incorporates five guitars and a keyboard solo by Manfred Mann 3/4 of the way into the song. The song was also included on the compilation albums The Best of Manfred Mann's Earth Band and Blinded by the Light & Other Hits. However, the single release did not achieve the success of their other Springsteen covers.

Other cover versions
This song was also covered by The Format for the Springsteen tribute album Light of Day. This version was also included on their B-Sides & Rarities album.

In 2005 The Disco Boys produced a dance version of the song, sampling the Manfred Mann's Earth Band cover.

Personnel
According to authors Philippe Margotin and Jean-Michel Guesdon:
Bruce Springsteen – vocals, acoustic guitar
Vini "Mad Dog" Lopez – drums
Garry Tallent – bass
David Sancious – piano, organ

Technical
Mike Appel – producer
Jim Cretecos – producer
Louis Lahav – recording engineer

References

1973 songs
Songs written by Bruce Springsteen
Bruce Springsteen songs
Greg Kihn songs
Manfred Mann songs
Songs about suicide
Song recordings produced by Mike Appel